Benholm Mill in Kincardineshire, Scotland, is a restored and fully working water-powered meal mill. It is sited in ancient woodland near Johnshaven (13 miles south of Stonehaven), by the farmlands of Sunset Song country – made famous by local author, Lewis Grassic Gibbon. It featured as Long Rob's Mill in the television serialisation of this novel. It is a category A listed building and is owned by Aberdeenshire Council.

History 
Benholm is now the only surviving traditional water-powered meal mill in this part of Aberdeenshire.  For hundreds of years it and numerous similar mills throughout Scotland were of vital importance to the rural community as the suppliers of the main food item. At its peak it produced oatmeal, bruised oats and hashed oats for an area extending from Montrose in the south to Barras and Catterline in the north and inland to Laurencekirk and Fordoun.

Current status 
The mill building was in partial use until 1982 and was gradually restored to its present state from 1986 onwards. Parts of it date back to the 18th century, though there are records of milling at Benholm as early as the 13th century. Other buildings on site are of mainly Victorian origin. The whole complex, with mill dam, reed bed, miller's croft and woodland walk, is now a local heritage visitor centre. The mill used to belong to Mr Lindsay Watson. Benholm itself today is a small hamlet made up of a church, the mill visitor centre/cafe and private dwellings.

The Mill of Benholm Trust worked with Aberdeenshire Council to provide work experience and training for adults with special needs, in catering, horticulture, furniture restoration, shop and office work. In April 2014 the mill closed due to health and safety issues.

The Mill of Benholm Enterprise (SCIO), a local charity organisation, is currently working together with the North East Scotland Preservation Trust to achieve an asset transfer from the current owner Aberdeenshire with the purpose of reopening this jewel of Mearns and Kincardineshire to the public once again and to stop any further deterioration of this A listed mill site, which got described by Historic Environment Scotland as “an exceptional and rare survival”.

References 

Watermills in Scotland
Category A listed buildings in Aberdeenshire
Tourist attractions in Aberdeenshire